Staines Greyhound Stadium was a greyhound racing stadium in Staines, Surrey (Middlesex at the time).

Origins and opening
Staines Greyhound track opened on 21 January 1928, and the first race was won by a greyhound called Oojah over 55 yards. The stadium was at Hythe End just north of the River Thames, south of Wraysbury Road. Previously this area was an unpopulated rural area that today makes up some of the Colne Valley Parks. The track was very basic with one main stand on the home straight. During its early existence it was sometimes referred to as Bell Weir Park.

Affiliation
It is believed that this track may have been affiliated to a governing body at one stage but for the majority of its existence traded as an independent (unaffiliated to a governing body) and therefore nicknamed a flapping track.

Cheetah racing
In 1936 Arthur Leggett, the owner of Romford Greyhound Stadium, decided to bring cheetah racing to the UK. Twelve cheetahs arrived from Kenya in December 1936, courtesy of explorer Kenneth Gandar-Dower. After six months of quarantine, the cheetahs were given time to acclimatise before Romford, Harringay Stadium and Staines were earmarked for the experiment with the cheetahs, running for the first time on Saturday 11 December 1937 at Romford.

The experiment failed and the racing was stopped because although the cheetahs were able to better the greyhound times, they had to be let off first when racing greyhounds, and when they raced against each other they became uninterested and stopped chasing the lure.

History
In 1938 a Putt Mossman Motorcycle rodeo took place (this was a form of motorcycle tricks and skills). Stock car racing was also popular in the late 1950s.

Staines owner Jack Walsh was in partnership with fellow bookmaker William Hill and they won the English Greyhound Derby with Lone Keel in 1938.

The track could hold a maximum of 5,000 spectators and supplied a tote with a turnover in 1947 of £47,165.

In 1949 Jack Walsh expressed his frustration with the authorities after his application to join the National Greyhound Racing Society was withheld. After agreeing to the completion and upgrading of facilities he was upset that the application also meant he would have to race on selected days as chosen by the NGRC as to avoid competition with Slough Stadium which was against his given rights as a track promoter as stated in the 1934 Betting and Lotteries Act, an action that he could not agree with.

Closure
The track closed in 1960 and was dismantled in 1965, making way for a section of M25 cutting through the nearby land west of the Queensmead Lake Reservoir. The derelict track appears in the 1964 movie Séance on a Wet Afternoon.

References

Defunct greyhound racing venues in the United Kingdom